Barbara Gourdet (born 29 December 1965 at Saintes) is a former French athlete, who specialized in the 800 meters.

Biography  
She won three French National 800m championships in 1987, 1988 and 1993.

Prize list  
 French Championships in Athletics   :  
 3 times winner of 800 m in 1987,  1988 and 1993.

Records

Notes and references  
 Docathlé2003, Fédération française d'athlétisme, 2003, p. 407

People from Saintes, Charente-Maritime
1965 births
Living people
French female middle-distance runners
Sportspeople from Charente-Maritime